Liechtenstein competed at the 2004 Summer Olympics in Athens, Greece, from 13 to 29 August 2004. This was the nation's sixteenth appearance at the Olympics, excluding the 1956 Summer Olympics in Melbourne, and the 1980 Summer Olympics in Moscow because of the United States boycott.

The National Olympic Committee of Liechtenstein (German: Liechtensteinischer Olympischer Sportverband, LOS) sent a single athlete to the Games. The spot was filled by rifle shooter Oliver Geissmann, who later carried the nation's flag in the opening ceremony.

Shooting

Liechtenstein has qualified a single shooter.

Men

References

External links
Official Report of the XXVIII Olympiad
Liechtenstein Olympic Committee 

Nations at the 2004 Summer Olympics
2004
Summer Olympics